Vojtech Christov (born 16 March 1945 in Vranov nad Topľou) is a former Czechoslovak football referee. He is known for having refereed in two FIFA World Cups, one match in 1982 (the opening game of the tournament between Belgium and Argentina) and one in 1986. He was assistant referee in the 1982 FIFA World Cup Final. He also refereed two matches in the 1984 UEFA European Football Championship in France, including the UEFA Euro 1984 Final and one match in the Olympic Football Tournament 1980 in Moscow. At club level, he refereed in the Czechoslovak First League between 1974 and 1992, taking charge of 198 matches during that period.

References

Profile

External links
 

1945 births
Slovak football referees
FIFA World Cup referees
1982 FIFA World Cup referees
1986 FIFA World Cup referees
Olympic football referees
Football referees at the 1980 Summer Olympics
Living people
Czechoslovak football referees
People from Vranov nad Topľou
Sportspeople from the Prešov Region
UEFA Euro 1984 referees
UEFA European Championship final referees